Custos Messium (Latin for harvest-keeper) was a constellation created by Jérôme Lalande in 1775 to honor Charles Messier. It was located between the constellations of Camelopardalis, Cassiopeia and Cepheus, next to another subsequently abandoned constellation, Rangifer the Reindeer. It is no longer recognized.

References

 SEDS retrieved 23 August 2006

External links
Michael E. Bakich (1995 22/09/2011)

Former constellations